Mispila (Mispila) is a subgenus of beetle in the genus Mispila. It was described by Francis Polkinghorne Pascoe in 1864.

References

Insect subgenera